Bekele Alemu (born 26 January 1941) is an Ethiopian boxer. He competed at the 1964 Summer Olympics and the 1968 Summer Olympics. At the 1968 Summer Olympics, he lost to Eric Blake of Great Britain.

References

1941 births
Living people
Ethiopian male boxers
Olympic boxers of Ethiopia
Boxers at the 1964 Summer Olympics
Boxers at the 1968 Summer Olympics
Sportspeople from Addis Ababa
Light-middleweight boxers